Nossa Senhora da Graça, which means "Our Lady of Grace" in Portuguese, can refer to:

 Nossa Senhora da Graça incident, a naval clash in 1610 near Nagasaki, Japan
 Nossa Senhora da Graça, a civil parish in Praia, Cape Verde (municipality)
 Nossa Senhora das Graças, a town in southern Brazil
 Nossa Senhora da Graça Fort, a fort in Portugal